Louis Bernatchez  (born 1960) is a Canadian professor of genetics at Laval University and a Canada Research Chair in genomics and conservation of aquatic resources.

Select awards and honours 
2001 - Michel-Jurdant Prize, ACFAS
2011 - Fellow, American Association for the Advancement of Science
2011 - Fellow, Royal Society of Canada
2012 - Prix Marie-Victorin, Government of Quebec
2020 - Knight, National Order of Quebec

References

External links
 Science.ca Profile

Living people
Canadian biologists
Fellows of the Royal Society of Canada
Fellows of the American Association for the Advancement of Science
1960 births
Academic staff of Université Laval
Université Laval alumni